Manurewa High School is one of the largest multicultural high school secondary schools in New Zealand, with an enrolment of over 2,000 students.

Manurewa High School is a multi-cultural school. It has Pacific 47%, Māori 24%, Asian 16%, New Zealand European/Pākehā 11% 
Other ethnicity 2%. Some cultures include Australian, Cambodian, Chinese (Taiwan, Hong Kong, Singapore), Cook Island, Dutch, Filipino, Fijian, French, French Polynesia, Indian, Indonesian, Iranian, Iraqi, Irish, New Zealand, Korean, Malaysian, New Caledonian, Niue, Polynesian, Samoan, South African, Sri Lankan, Syrian, Thai, Tongan, Vietnamese. Once a year it holds an International Week to honour this multi-culturalism.

This is arranged through the Royal New Zealand Foundation of the Blind in association with their  major educational facility, the Homai College for the Blind which is within walking distance of Manurewa High School. Blind and Visually Impaired students are placed in normal classroom environments and are assisted through the provisioning of specialised equipment and resources (such as Braille versions of textbooks), and staff trained to meet their special needs are available. This allows the students to participate fully in the school curriculum without any significant segregation.

Notable alumni

 Bundee Aki – Counties Manukau Steelers, Waikato Chiefs and the Ireland National Rugby Team
 Mark Cooksley – All Black
 Greg Eastwood – rugby league player
 Henry Fa'afili – rugby league player
 Tim Nanai-Williams – NZ Secondary Schools Rugby, NZ Sevens, Counties Manukau Steelers, Waikato Chiefs and Samoa Sevens
 Wendy Petrie – TV newsreader
 Jim Richards (racing driver) – three times Australian Touring Car Champion, seven times Bathurst winner
 Mark Sagapolutele, also known as Mareko – rapper
 Daryl Tuffey – New Zealand fast bowler
 John Walker – athlete, Olympic gold medalist
 Erin Clark – Rugby League player, Warriors, Canberra Raiders, Samoan Rugby League Team, Gold Coast Titans
 Aroha Savage – New Zealand Black Ferns
 Jawsh 685 - music producer

Notes

Secondary schools in Auckland
Educational institutions established in 1960
1960 establishments in New Zealand